Vullietoliva foxi is a species of sea snail, a marine gastropod mollusk in the family Olividae, the olives.

References

Olividae